Robert Locke (born 1944) in Vallejo, California, sometimes known by the pseudonym Clayton Bess is an American writer, playwright, and librarian.

Personal life
Robert Locke spent three years in Liberia as part of the Peace Corps.

Works
Books
Story for a Black Night (1982)
The Truth About the Moon (1984)
Tracks (1986)
Mayday Rampage (1993)
Big Man and the Burn-Out
Stage plays
Rose Jewel and Harmony
On Daddy's Birthday
The Dolly
 Murder and Edna Redrum

Awards and honors
 1982 California Book Awards - (silver) First Novel
 1987 Best Book for Young Adults - American Library Association
 “A Contribution of Cultural Significance” - the Southern California Council on Literature for Children and Young People
 Family Circle - Best Book for Kids
 2002 Phoenix Award Honor Book

References

External links

Author website

American writers
1944 births
Living people